Dilan Jayalath (born 27 January 1997) is a Sri Lankan cricketer. He made his first-class debut for Sinhalese Sports Club in the 2016–17 Premier League Tournament on 15 December 2016. He made his Twenty20 debut for Sinhalese Sports Club in the 2017–18 SLC Twenty20 Tournament on 1 March 2018. He made his List A debut for Sinhalese Sports Club in the 2017–18 Premier Limited Overs Tournament on 12 March 2018.

References

External links
 

1997 births
Living people
Sri Lankan cricketers
Sinhalese Sports Club cricketers
People from North Western Province, Sri Lanka